Sector 4 is an administrative unit of Bucharest.

Economy 

Romavia had its head office in Sector 4.

Quarters 

 Berceni
 Giurgiului
 Olteniței
 Progresul
 
 Tineretului
 Văcărești

Carol Park, Tineretului Park, and the Văcărești Nature Park are all located in Sector 4 of Bucharest.

Politics 

Daniel Băluță from the Social Democratic Party (PSD) is the current mayor, having been elected to the position in 2016 and re-elected in 2020. The Local Council of Sector 4 has 27 seats, with the following party composition (as of 2020):

References

External links 

 Sector 4 

Sectors of Bucharest